Translocon-associated protein subunit alpha is a protein that in humans is encoded by the SSR1 gene.

The signal sequence receptor (SSR) is a glycosylated endoplasmic reticulum (ER) membrane receptor associated with protein translocation across the ER membrane. The SSR consists of 2 subunits, a 34-kD glycoprotein encoded by this gene and a 22-kD glycoprotein. This gene generates several mRNA species as a result of complex alternative polyadenylation. This gene is unusual in that it utilizes arrays of polyA signal sequences that are exclusively non-canonical.

References

Further reading